While a number of biblical place names like Jerusalem, Athens, Damascus, Alexandria, Babylon and Rome have been used for centuries, some have changed over the years. Many place names in the Land of Israel/Holy Land/Palestine are Arabised forms of ancient Hebrew and Canaanite place-names used during biblical times or later Aramaic or Greek formations. Most of these names have been handed down for thousands of years though their meaning was understood by only a few.

Hebrew Bible / Old Testament

New Testament

See also
 Place names of Palestine
 List of minor biblical places
 Cities in the Book of Joshua
 List of Biblical place names in North America

Notes

References

Name
Historical geography
Land of Israel
 
Middle East-related lists
Toponymy